The seventh season of The Real Housewives of Orange County, an American reality television series, was broadcast on Bravo. It aired from February 7, 2012 until July 24, 2012, and was primarily filmed in Orange County, California. Its executive producers are Adam Karpel, Alex Baskin, Douglas Ross, Gregory Stewart, Scott Dunlop, Stephanie Boyriven and Andy Cohen.

The Real Housewives of Orange County focuses on the lives of Vicki Gunvalson, Tamra Barney, Gretchen Rossi, Alexis Bellino and Heather Dubrow. It consisted of 23 episodes.

Production and crew
In August 2011, The Real Housewives of Orange County was renewed for a seventh season and in December 2011, it was revealed that it was slated to air in February the following year. The season premiere "Stranger Things Have Happened" was aired on February 7, 2012, while the twentieth episode "Are You in or Out?" served as the season finale, and was aired on June 26, 2012.
It was followed by a two-part reunion that aired on July 10 and July 16, 2012 and a "Lost Footage" special on July 24, 2012, which marked the conclusion of the season.
Adam Karpel, Alex Baskin, Douglas Ross, Gregory Stewart, Scott Dunlop, Stephanie Boyriven and Andy Cohen are recognized as the series' executive producers; it is produced and distributed by Evolution Media.

Cast and synopsis
Four of the fives housewives featured on the sixth season of The Real Housewives of Orange County returned for the seventh instalment. The season saw Peggy Tanous departing the series by her own choice, but continued to make guest appearances throughout the season. In April 2014, Tanous revealed leaving the series alleviated a lot of her anxiety. Also departing the series were season six recurring cast members, Jeana Keough and Fernanda Rocha, however Keough returns in several guest appearances. Filling Tanous' place in the series is Heather Dubrow who is described as a "former actress and now stay-at-home mother of four, who's married to a prominent Newport Beach plastic surgeon."

Vicki Gunvalson's divorce from Donn continues to process as she and her boyfriend Brooks Ayers are met with resistance from friends and family which forever damage Gunvalson's relationships. Vicki puts her home up for sale as she ventures in to her new life. Tamra Barney's relationship with her boyfriend Eddie Judge becomes increasingly serious. The relationship continues to develop after a trip in Bora Bora when Eddie proposes. Barney continues to sell houses to support herself, which include trying to sell to the new wife Dubrow. Barney and Gretchen Rossi form an unexpected friendship despite years of feuding which places a strain on Barney's friendship with Gunvalson, and Rossi's relationships with Alexis Bellino and Slade Smiley. Rossi performs with The Pussycat Dolls with the intention of jump-starting a career in the entertainment industry. Rossi's feud with Gunvalson worsens as Smiley makes fun of the housewives during his comedy routine. Bellino begins her new role as a morning news correspondent with the intention to one day host her own talk show. Bellino's lifestyle comes into question from the other ladies after they deem it "phony" and attempt an intervention. Dubrow raises her four children with her plastic surgeon husband Terry. Heather's "picture perfect life" leaves Alexis feeling competitive and jealous. Heather attempts to get back into acting by heading to an audition.

 Gunvalson's daughter, Briana, makes an appearance at the reunion. She sits at the head of the right couch between Andy and her mother.

Episodes

References

External links

 
 
 

2012 American television seasons
Orange County (season 7)